Oedura coggeri, commonly known as the northern spotted velvet gecko, is a species of gecko, a lizard in the family Diplodactylidae. The species is endemic to Queensland, Australia.

Etymology
The specific name, coggeri, is in honor of Australian herpetologist Harold Cogger.

Habitat
The preferred natural habitat of O. coggeri is rocky areas in forest.

Reproduction
O. coggeri is oviparous.

References

Further reading
Baker, Cherryl Richards; Brattstrom, Bayard H.; Brattstrom, Martha A. (1998). "Microhabitat utilization by some Queensland, Australia geckos". Dactylus 3 (3): 97–102.
Bustard, H. Robert (1966). "The Oedura tryoni complex: east Australian rock-dwelling geckos. (Reptilia : Gekkonidae)". Bulletin of the British Museum (Natural History), Zoology 14: 1–14. (Oedura coggeri, new species, pp. 9–12).
Cogger, Harold G. (2014). Reptiles and Amphibians of Australia, Seventh Edition. Clayton, Victoria, Australia: CSIRO Publishing. xxx + 1,033 pp. .
Wilson, Steve, Swan, Gerry (2013). A Complete Guide to Reptiles of Australia, Fourth Edition. Sydney: New Holland Publishers. 522 pp. .

Oedura
Reptiles described in 1966
Taxa named by H. Robert Bustard
Geckos of Australia